Käferberg (el. ) and Waidberg (el. ) are the summits of a wooded mountain respectively chain of hills overlooking the inner city of Zürich, Zürichsee, Albis chain and Uetliberg, as well as the Limmat Valley and the Zürcher Unterland in Switzerland.

Geography 
Käferberg (Swiss German: Chäferberg meaning mountain of beetles) and Waidberg (mountain of meadows) are the peaks of a longish mountain in the north of the Limmat Valley. It is located in the Zürich districts of Höngg, Wipkingen and Affoltern, between Bucheggplatz and ETH-Hönggerberg, known as Science City, and the western Hönggerberg heading on the northern border of the Limmat valley to Würenlos. In the east, Käferberg is bordered by a small mountain pass between Bucheggplatz and Milchbuck at Zürichberg, leading from the city of Zürich to the Glatt valley. In the north, the region is bordered by the Glatt,  and Furt valleys.

From northwest to southeast, Käferberg-Waidberg is part of a chain of peaks respectively mountains: Hönggerberg, Käferberg-Waidberg, Zürichberg, Adlisberg, Öschbrig, Wassberg, Forch mountain pass, Guldenen and Pfannenstiel.

Points of interest 
It is a picturesque location, and the upper southwestern side is also the location of restaurants overlooking the city of Zürich and the Limmat Valley. The upper area of the mountain is mostly woodland and a popular recreational area with picnic sites, in addition there are hiking routes heading from Bucheggplatz to the canton of Aargau and a Vita Parcours. Rarely to find in the urban area of Zürich are Centaurea, Salvia pratensis, Knautia and Sand Lizards on the southwestern upper hill. Schrebergärten are typical for the southern and northern upper parts, too. The Wärmebad Käferberg is located in the south nearby the city hospital Waid (Waidspital) and a Deer inhabit.

Another restaurant, a Tennis club and a small TV tower are situated within the woodland at Waidberg summit, nearby the former Freibad (public open air bath) Waidbad which is now a popular pic-nic site, too. The area is used for recreation and sport on a clearing not far from the ETH-Hönggerberg. There was a project to renew the Waidbad as a site of wellness, to integrate the area in a so-called "forest spa" including indoor baths, sauna, cafeteria, complete infrastructure and attractive outdoor grounds.

ETH Zurich "Science City" 
Science City is a campus of the ETH Zurich located on the eastern Käferberg slope respectively on western part of the Hönggerberg hill (officially the campus is named "ETH Hönggerberg", too). ETH Zurich declares it as  vision of a university campus and a "City district of brainstorming culture" which will transform the ETH site into a place with greater quality of life through a variety of measures. It is also declared as a platform that will make it possible for the ETH Zurich to realize future projects that are based on the pioneering and symbolic development of future living and cognitive space.

Transportation 
The tram numbers 11 and 15 to Bucheggplatz, tram 13 alongside the southern area to Frankental as well as the bus line 80 Oerlikon–Altstetten–Triemli, bus line 38 (Höngg), trolley bus line 46 (City–Rütihof) and bus line 69 (Milchbuck–Hönggerberg) run up to different parts of the mountain area.

In September 2014 a study was published for the construction of a new rail tunnel and underground station serving the ETH Hönggerberg "Science City". The new tunnel would run directly between Hardbrücke and Regensdorf stations, as opposed to the indirect route via the existing Käferberg Tunnel and Oerlikon station that is currently used by service S6.

History 
In addition to a total of 15 bastions and Letzinen (palisades) outside of the Fortifications of Zürich, in the 17th century the area was part of the so-called third fortifications of the city of Zürich. Since 1907, the houses "Zur Waid" served as Krankenheim, a small public hospital. The so-called Waidgut was rebuilt in 1918 as an urban nursing home which is since 1962/3 the care center Käferberg. As part of the incorporation of the former municipality Höngg, the forest area on Käferberg owned by the citizens was sold in 1934 to the city of Zürich as well as the other areas of the former urban forest located there. Even today, there are large, contiguous agricultural land in the immediate neighborhood of the "Science City".

Literature 
 Hochbaudepartement der Stadt Zürich, Amt für Städtebau: Affoltern, Oerlikon, Schwamendingen, Seebach. Baukultur in Zürich, Band I, Verlag Neue Zürcher Zeitung, Zürich 2003, .
 Martin Bürlimann, Kurt Gammeter: Wipkingen - Vom Dorf zum Quartier. Wibichinga Verlag, Zürich Wipkingen 2006, .

References

External links 

 Official website of the city of Zürich: Perimeter (Käferberg) 
 Quartierverein Affoltern 
 Quartierverein Höngg 
 Quartierverein Wipkingen 

Mountains of Switzerland
Geography of Zürich
Tourist attractions in Zürich
Mountains of the canton of Zürich
Mountains of Switzerland under 1000 metres